Andreas Schillinger (born 13 July 1983 in Kümmersbruck) is a German former cyclist, who rode professionally between 2006 and 2021 for Continental Team Milram,  and .

Major results

2003
 3rd Time trial, National Under-23 Road Championships
2004
 8th Overall Mainfranken-Tour
2005
 2nd Rund um den Sachsenring
2006
 1st Tour du Jura
 2nd Rund um den Sachsenring
 4th Druivenkoers Overijse
2008
 4th Prague–Karlovy Vary–Prague
 7th Overall Tour de Beauce
1st Stage 5
2009
 1st Beverbeek Classic
 2nd Overall Five Rings of Moscow
1st Stage 5
2010
 1st Prague–Karlovy Vary–Prague
 3rd Road race, National Road Championships
 8th Trofeo Magaluf-Palmanova
2012
 1st Rund um die Nürnberger Altstadt
2013
 3rd Ronde van Drenthe
2015
 3rd Rund um Köln
2016
 9th Rudi Altig Race
2018
 2nd Overall Czech Cycling Tour
1st Stage 1 (TTT)
2019
 3rd Road race, National Road Championships
 5th Rund um Köln

Grand Tour general classification results timeline

References

External links

1983 births
Living people
German male cyclists
People from Amberg-Sulzbach
Sportspeople from the Upper Palatinate
Cyclists from Bavaria